Frederick Melton "Foghorn" Clancy (April 4, 1882, Phenix City, Alabama – April 28, 1957) was a rodeo promoter, historian and author.

He wrote My Fifty Years in Rodeo: Living with Cowboys, Horses and Danger (San Antonio: Naylor Company, 1952).

Clancy was inducted into the National Cowboy & Western Heritage Museum’s Rodeo Hall of Fame in 1991.

Further reading
The American West Dee Brown – 2012 
Rodeo history and records, by Fog Horn Clancy. ([Waverly, N.Y., s.n., c1947])
Foghorn Jr.: 1923

References

20th-century American non-fiction writers
20th-century American historians
1882 births
1957 deaths
20th-century American male writers
American male non-fiction writers
Rodeo announcers
Rodeo promoters and managers